John Evans Knowles (30 November 1914 – 18 December 2011) was a Progressive Conservative party member of the House of Commons of Canada. Born in North Walsingham Township, Ontario, he was a farmer by career.

He was first elected at the Norfolk riding in the 1957 general election and re-elected for second term in the 1958 election. In the 1962 election, Knowles was defeated by Jack Roxburgh of the Liberal party. Knowles was also unsuccessful in unseating Roxburgh in the 1963 and 1965 elections.

Knowles remained active in late 2008, providing comment to local media on that year's federal election. He died after a short illness in 2011.

References

External links
 

1914 births
2011 deaths
Progressive Conservative Party of Canada MPs
Members of the House of Commons of Canada from Ontario
Canadian farmers
People from Norfolk County, Ontario